Flow also known in Danish as Ækte vare (meaning genuine) is a 2014 film by Danish film director Fenar Ahmad based on a screenplay by Anders Ølholm.Already known for his short films, this is Fenar Ahmad's debut long film feature.

Synopsis
Mikael (played by Danish rapper Gilli grew up in Brøndby Strand an impoverished large housing project area with high concentration of immigrants. Together with Tariq, Samir and Eddy, he has a dream of living making music and rapping. They are a cohesive crew that sticks together and the crew members defend each other at all costs. Mikael is the group's talent, and more serious than the others. That's what the older incumbent rapper, Apollo, sees in him. As Apollo needs help in making a comeback, he hires Mikael to write his songs. While Apollo introduces Mikael for the hub and excesses of the music world and partying, tours, abundance of ladies, his earlier friends begin to doubt Mikael's loyalty to them. At the same time, Apollo is beginning to understand that Mikael's talent is far greater than his own - and Apollo is in no way interested in letting Mikael in the foreground. But real talent is hard to hold down and the showdown is inevitable.

Cast
Kian Rosenberg Larsson (aka Gilli) as Mikael
Ali Sivandi as Tariq
Lirim Jusufi as Samir
Benny Jamz as Eddie
Rasmus Hammerich as Apollo
Sivas Torbati as S!vas
Hassan El Sayed as Hussein
Hilal Anyabo as Hilal
Marijana Jankovic as Jelana
Frederik Christian Johansen as Jens
Maria Erwolter	as Mor
Casper Sloth as Christian
Morten Ruben Sørensen as Klaus
Mikkel Arndt as fitter
Ediz Caliskan as Rapper
Ana Maria Solbjerg as Asra
Songul Aras as Baseema
Reza Sivandi as Tariq's father
Eysar Al-Jadri as Tariq's mother
Adam Al-Jadri as Tariq's small brother
Esat Ünal as a DJ
Reza Forghani as a DJ
Idris Ahmad as Rashid
Kata Jankovic as Jelana's mother

Soundtrack
The soundtrack for the film was released on 1 April 2014 on ArtPeople with rap music by Gilli, and additional music by MellemFingaMuzik, Murro, KESI, Højer Øye (known by stage name Benny Jamz), Reza Forghani and rapper S!vas. It also contains music by music producer Jens Ole McCoy also known as Carmon (part of the Danish hip hop duo Ukendt Kunstner).

The soundtrack album charted on the Danish Hitlisten Albums Chart peaking at number 8.

Tracklist
"Grå Dage" (Gilli feat. Murro) (2.40)
"Knokler Hårdt (Gilli) (4.05)
"Ung Entreprenør" (Gilli feat. MellemFingaMuzik) (5:57)
"Hele Igennem" (Gilli feat. KESI & Højer Øye) (4:21)
"Hårde Tider" (Gilli feat. Højer Øye) (3:50)
"Penge Kommer Går" (Gilli 3:41)
"Trykker Sedler" (Gilli feat. S!vas & MellemFingaMuzik) (5:23)
"Alt Jeg Har Set" (Gilli feat. Murro) (3:59)

Reception
Soundvenues reviewer Jacob Ludvigsen gave the film four out of six possible stars. Ekko Filmmagasinet's Nikolaj Mangurten Rubin also gave it 4 stars.

Award nominations
The film was nominated for six awards:

New Talent Grand PIX for film director Fenar Ahmad during the 2014 CPH PIX Aiards 
Audience Award for the film during the 2015 Danish Film Awards (Robert)
The Robert (award) for "Best Children/Youth Film" for the film during the 2015 Danish Film Awards (Robert)
The Robert (award) for "Best Sound" for Peter Albrechtsen during the 2015 Danish Film Awards (Robert)
The Zulu Award for Best Film for Fenar Ahmad during 2015 Zulu Awards
Best Supporting Actor for Ali Sivandi during the Bodil Awards 2015

References

External links

2014 films
Danish musical drama films
2010s Danish-language films